Peter Barrington Hutton (August 24, 1944 – June 25, 2016) was an American experimental filmmaker, known primarily for his silent cinematic portraits of cities and landscapes around the world.  He also worked as a professional cinematographer, most notably for his former student Ken Burns, as well as cinematography for Lizzie Borden's "Born in Flames," Sheila McLaughlin and Lynne Tillman's "Committed," assorted films by artist Red Grooms and Albert Maysles' The Gates.

Early life and education
Born in Detroit, Michigan, Hutton studied painting, sculpture, and film at the San Francisco Art Institute.

Career
In 1987, Hutton was awarded Best Cinematography for his work on Phil Hartman's feature film "No Picnic" at the Sundance Film Festival.

In 2011, the National Film Registry of the Library of Congress selected "Study of a River" as one of 25 films annually chosen. He  taught filmmaking at CalArts, Hampshire College, Harvard University, SUNY Purchase, and Bard College, where he served as the director of the Film and Electronic Arts Program since 1989.

Much of Hutton's career was influenced by his time in the merchant marines.

Hutton's films are distributed by Canyon Cinema in San Francisco and Arsenal – Institut für Film und Videokunst in Berlin. In May 2008 the Museum of Modern Art in New York held a full retrospective of Hutton's films. His most recent work, Three Landscapes, premiered at the Toronto International Film Festival in September 2013.

Hutton died of cancer at the age of 71 on June 25, 2016.

Selected filmography
In Marin County (1970)
July '71 in San Francisco, Living at Beach Street, Working at Canyon Cinema, Swimming in the Valley of the Moon (1971)
New York Near Sleep for Saskia (1972)
Images of Asian Music (A Diary from Life 1973-1974) (1973-1974)
Florence (1975)
Boston Fire (1979)
New York Portrait: Chapter One (1978-1979)
New York Portrait: Chapter Two (1980-1981)
Budapest Portrait (Memories of a City) (1984-1986)
Landscape for Manon (1986)
New York Portrait: Chapter Three (1990)
In Titan's Goblet (1991)
Lodz Symphony (1991-1993)
Study of a River (1996-1997)
Time and Tide (2000)
Looking at the Sea (2001)
Two Rivers (2001-2002)
Skagafjordur (2002-2004)
At Sea (2007)
Three Landscapes (2013)

Exhibitions
 2010: Les Rencontres d'Arles, France.

References

External links
Peter Hutton at Canyon Cinema Cooperative
Peter Hutton at Arsenal – Institut für Film und Videokunst
Interview with Peter Hutton

1944 births
2016 deaths
American experimental filmmakers
Hampshire College faculty
Harvard University faculty
Bard College faculty
Artists from Detroit